The following list of national founding figures is a record, by country, of people who were credited with establishing a state. National founders are typically those who played an influential role in setting up the systems of governance, (i.e., political system form of government, and constitution), of the country. They can also be military leaders of a war of independence that led to the establishment of a sovereign state.

Africa

Algeria
Ahmed Ben Bella served as first Prime Minister of Algeria from 1962 to 1963, then as first President of Algeria from 1963 to 1965.

Angola
Agostinho Neto served as first President of Angola from 1975 to 1979.

Benin
Hubert Maga served as first President of Dahomey from 1960 to 1963.

Botswana
Seretse Khama served as first President of Botswana from 1966 to 1980.

Burkina Faso
Thomas Sankara served as first President of Burkina Faso from 1983 to 1987.

Burundi
Michel Micombero was the first President of Burundi from 1966 to 1976

Cameroon
Ahmadou Ahidjo served as first President of Cameroon from 1960 to 1982.

Cape Verde
Amílcar Cabral (var. Amílcar Lopes da Costa Cabral) (1924–1973) was an agricultural engineer, writer, and a nationalist thinker and political leader. He was also one of Africa's foremost anti-colonial leaders. Amílcar Cabral led the nationalist movement of Guinea-Bissau and Cape Verde Islands and the ensuing war of independence in Guinea-Bissau. He was assassinated on 20 January 1973, several months before Guinea-Bissau's unilateral declaration of independence. He is considered a founder of Cape Verde. Aristides Pereira served as first President of Cape Verde from 1975 to 1991.

Central African Republic
David Dacko served as first President of Central African Republic from 1960 to 1966. The constitution outlines him as being the "Founding Father."

Chad
François Tombalbaye served as first President of Chad from 1960 to 1975.

Comoros

Ahmed Abdallah (State of the Comoros; First president of the Federal and Islamic Republic of the Comoros) Ali Soilih (State of the Comoros; First president) Azali Assoumani (Union of the Comoros)

Republic of the Congo
Fulbert Youlou served as first President of the Republic of the Congo from 1960 to 1963.

Democratic Republic of the Congo
Patrice Lumumba, Joseph Kasa-Vubu, Albert Kalonji, Jean Bolikango, Cléophas Kamitatu, and Paul Bolya are all considered "Fathers of Independence" in the Congo.

Djibouti
Hassan Gouled Aptidon served as first President of Djibouti from 1977 to 1999.

Egypt
There is no agreed founder of Egypt as the area was politically unified around 3000 BC and has since endured multiple changes in terms of government and polities.

The prevailing historical view is that Muhammad Ali (1769–1849) is the Father of Modern Egypt, being the first ruler since the Ottoman conquest in 1517 to permanently divest the Porte of its power in Egypt. While failing to achieve formal independence for Egypt during his lifetime, he was successful in laying the foundation for a modern Egyptian state.

The Founder of Independent Egypt, Saad Zaghloul (1859–1927), was a politician who served in many ministries of the Egyptian government, and was imprisoned by the British government in Malta, but returned to Egypt to participate in the revolution of 1919. Zaghloul then was able to make the Sultan of Egypt (later King) Fuad I convince the British to grant Egypt independence with a friendly British-Egyptian relationship and in 1922, Egypt was proclaimed an independent kingdom, the Kingdom of Egypt with Saad Zaghloul as its prime minister. British military presence in Egypt ended with nationalisation of Suez Canal in 1956.

Equatorial Guinea
Francisco Macías Nguema served as first President of Equatorial Guinea from 1968 to 1979.

Eritrea
Isaias Afwerki serves as first President of Eritrea from 1993 to present.

Eswatini

Ethiopia
Menelik I is claimed to be first the first Emperor of Ethiopia during the 10th century B.C (975–950 B.C). Yekuno Amlak founded the Solomonic dynasty and was the first emperor of the Ethiopian Empire from 1270 to 1285 A.D.
Menelik II is the founder of modern Ethiopian state.

Gabon
Léon M'ba served as first President of Gabon from 1961 to 1967.

The Gambia
Dawda Jawara served as first Prime Minister of the Gambia from 1962 to 1970. Independence from United Kingdom was achieved in 1965.

Ghana
Kwame Nkrumah (1909–1972) led the nation to its independence from the United Kingdom in 1957.

Guinea
Ahmed Sékou Touré (var. Ahmed Seku Turay) (1922–1984) was a Guinean political leader and President of Guinea from 1958 to his death in 1984. Touré was one of the primary Guinean nationalists involved in the independence of the country from France.

He is with Kwame Nkrumah one of the founders of the African Union, and the Guinean Diallo Telli was the first general secretary of the African Union.

Guinea-Bissau
Luís Cabral served as first President of Guinea-Bissau from 1973 to 1980.

Ivory Coast
Félix Houphouët-Boigny served as first President of Ivory Coast from 1960 to 1993.

Kenya
Jomo Kenyatta served as the first Prime Minister (1963–1964) and President (1964–1978) of the Republic. Oginga Odinga served as the first vice-president.

Lesotho
Leabua Jonathan served as Prime Minister of Lesotho from 1965 to 1986. Independence from United Kingdom was achieved in 1966.

Liberia
Joseph Jenkins Roberts (1809–1876) was born a free man of African American descent. He migrated to Liberia in 1829 with his family to join  
thousands of other African Americans resettled from 1820 based on efforts of the American Colonization Society. In 1839, Roberts became Liberia's lieutenant governor and afterwards, its governor (1841–1848). He is known as the father of Liberia and officially declared Liberia's independence in 1847. The descendants of Roberts and the African American settlers are the Americo-Liberian people.

Libya
King Idris Al-sanusi, also known as Idris I of Libya, (1889–1983) was the first and only king of Libya, reigning from 1951 to 1969, and the Chief of the Senussi Muslim order. Idris as-Senussi proclaimed an independent Emirate of Cyrenaica in 1949. He was also invited to become Emir of Tripolitania, another of the three traditional regions that now constitute modern Libya (the third being Fezzan). By accepting he began the process of uniting Libya under a single monarchy. A constitution was enacted in 1949 and adopted in October 1951. A National Congress elected Idris as King of Libya, and as Idris I he proclaimed the independence of the Kingdom of Libya as a sovereign state on 24 December 1951.

Madagascar
 The King Radama I, the first Malagasy sovereign to be recognized as King of Madagascar (1810–1828).
 Philibert Tsiranana, the first President of Madagascar from 1959 to 1972.

Malawi
Hastings Banda served as first Prime Minister of Malawi from 1964 to 1966, then as first President from 1966 to 1994.

Mali
Modibo Keïta served as first President of Mali from 1960 to 1968.

Mauritania
Moktar Ould Daddah served as first President of Mauritania from 1960 to 1978.

Mauritius
Seewoosagur Ramgoolam served as first Prime Minister of Mauritius from 1968 to 1982.

Morocco
The first Moroccan state was established by Idris I in 788.
The 'Alawi dynasty, which rules the country to this day, was established by Sharif bin Ali in 1631.

Mozambique
Samora Machel served as first President of Mozambique from 1975 to 1986.

Namibia
 Dr. Sam Shafiishuna Nujoma served as first President of Namibia from 1990 to 2005.
 Andimba Toivo ya Toivo was the iconic figure of the Namibian Liberation struggle.
 Hosea Kutako is considered by many as the Father of Namibian Nationalism.
 Hendrik Witbooi was the Nama captain who led the early resistance against Germans in the late 1800s.
 Jonker Afrikaner was the founder of the first rudimentary state in the territory of Namibia.

Niger
Hamani Diori served as first President of Niger from 1960 to 1974.

Nigeria
 Herbert Macaulay (1864–1946)
 Professor Eyo Ita (1903–1972)
 Alvan Ikoku (1900–1971)
 Dr. Nnamdi Azikiwe (1904–1996)
 Chief Obafemi Awolowo (1909–1987)
 Al-Haji Sir Ahmadu Bello (1910–1966)
 Al-Haji Sir Abubakar Tafawa Balewa (1912–1966) served as first Prime Minister of Nigeria from 1957 to 1966. Independence from United Kingdom was achieved in 1960.
 Chief Anthony Enahoro (1923–2010)
 Sir Egbert Udo Udoma (1917–1998)
 Al-Haji Aminu Kano (1920–1983)
 Chief S. A. Ajayi (1910–1994)
 Joseph Tarka (1932–1980)
 Dennis Osadebay (1911–1994)

All are considered founders of Nigeria. The troika of Obafemi Awolowo, Nnamdi Azikiwe, and Ahmadu Bello negotiated Nigeria's independence from Britain, aided by such figures as Chief Funmilayo Ransome-Kuti.

Rwanda
Grégoire Kayibanda served as first President of Rwanda from 1962 to 1973.

São Tomé and Príncipe
Manuel Pinto da Costa served as first President of São Tomé and Príncipe from 1975 to 1991.

Sierra Leone
Freetown, Sierra Leone was founded in part by a Black American soldier, Thomas Peters in 1792, after managing to convince British abolitionists to help settle 1,192 Black Americans who fought for the British in return for freedom. Peters, alongside other Black Americans David George and Moses Wilkinson, were influential in the establishment of Freetown, but it was Peters who is remembered today as the true influential leader and founder of Sierra Leone. The descendants of Peters and the Black American founders form part of the Krio ethnicity today and in 2011, a statue was erected in Freetown to honour him.

Senegal 
The founder of modern Senegal is Léopold Sédar Senghor. He served as first President from 1960 to 1980.

Seychelles
James Mancham served as first President of Seychelles from 1976 to 1977. He was one of the last White African presidents in the history of Africa. He considered himself the self-proclaimed "Founding Father"; however this title is often attributed to his socialist successor France-Albert René, who led the country to become one of the most democratic and most economically-stable states in Africa.

Somalia 
The Somali Youth League played a major role for Somalia's independence since the 1940s, with two of its members having served as the first two Somali presidents, Aden Adde and Abdirashid Shermarke. There are several murals and monuments dedicated to the SYL's independence movement in Mogadishu.

Republic of South Africa
Nelson Mandela (1918–2013) was the President of South Africa, in office from 1994 to 1999. He led the negotiations, together with F. W. de Klerk, to racially integrate and unite the country.

Other anti-apartheid activists include:
 Oliver Tambo
 Walter Sisulu
 Govan Mbeki
 Joe Slovo
 Ahmed Kathrada
 Raymond Mhlaba
 Robert Sobukwe
 Joe Modise
 Jacob Zuma
 Chris Hani

South Sudan
 John Garang was the main figure involved in spawning and leading the South Sudanese Independence Movement. Even though he did not live to see his country attain independence, he is often regarded as the "Father of the Nation."
 Salva Kiir Mayardit serves as first President of South Sudan from 2011 to present.

Sudan
Ibrahim Abboud served as first President of Sudan from 1958 to 1964.

Tanzania

Being the first President of Tanzania, Julius Nyerere was the main figure involved in achieving Tanzania's independence. He is often regarded as the "Father of the Nation."

Togo
Sylvanus Olympio served as first President of Togo from 1960 to 1963.

Tunisia
The founder of the modern Tunisia is Habib Bourguiba. He served as first President from 1957 to 1987 after leading Tunisia to independence from France in 1956 as Prime Minister; then after overthrowing the kingdom he modernized Tunisia, built schools and hospitals, and gave Tunisian women better human rights than other countries, and these rights still continue to be exercised by Tunisian women to this day.

Uganda
Milton Obote was a Ugandan political leader who led Uganda to independence from British colonial rule in 1962. Following the nation's independence, he served as prime minister of Uganda from 1962 to 1966 and the second president of Uganda from 1966 to 1971, then again from 1980 to 1985.

Zambia

 Kenneth Kaunda (1924–2021) is the prominent icon in the independence and unification of Zambia. He served as first President from 1964 to 1991. However, there are important personalities like Simon Kapwepwe and Harry Nkumbula (1916–18) that fairly deserve recognition. Together, in their different capacities, they led the nation to freedom.

Zimbabwe
Abel Muzorewa (1925–2010) was the first black Prime Minister of Zimbabwe Rhodesia.Robert Mugabe (1924–2019) was the leader of ZANU-PF, who ruled Zimbabwe from 1980 to 2017.Others
 Rekayi Tangwena
 Tichafa Samuel Parirenyatwa
 Joshua Nkomo
 Leopold Takawira
 Simon Muzenda
 Ndabaningi Sithole
 Herbert Chitepo
 Josiah Tongogara
 Enos Nkala
 Edgar Tekere
 George Nyandoro
 James Chikerema
 Solomon Mujuru
 Alfred Nikita Mangena
 Josiah Tungamirai
 Jason Ziyaphapha Moyo
 George Silundika
 Dumiso Dabengwa
 Lookout Masuku

Americas

Antigua and Barbuda
Vere Bird served as first Prime Minister of Antigua and Barbuda from 1981 to 1994.

Argentina
Manuel Belgrano and José de San Martín were important figures in early Argentina.

Bahamas
Lynden Pindling is considered the "Father of the Nation". He served as first Prime Minister of the Bahamas from 1967 to 1992. Independence from United Kingdom was achieved in 1973.

Barbados
Errol Barrow served as first Prime Minister of Barbados from 1966 to 1976.

Belize
George Cadle Price (1919–2011) is considered to be the Father of the Nation of Belize. He served as head of government of British Honduras, later Belize from 1961 to 1984. Independence from United Kingdom was achieved in 1981.

Bolivia
Simón Bolívar (1783–1830) and Antonio José de Sucre (1795–1830) are considered to be the founders of Bolivia.

Brazil

Pedro Álvares Cabral (1467/68–1520) commander of the first Portuguese fleet to arrive in South America. José Bonifácio de Andrada (1763–1838), known as "Patriarch of Independence", is considered the maximum leader of the Independence movement because of his intellectual mentorship and political prominence, and Pedro I of Brazil (1798–1834), son of the King João VI of Portugal, the symbol of the "center of force and union", according to the Bonifácio strategy.

Canada

The name "Fathers of Confederation" is given to those who attended the Charlottetown and Quebec Conferences in 1864, and the London Conference of 1866, to establish the Canadian Confederation. There were 36 original Fathers of Confederation. Queen Victoria, who supported and encouraged this process, is known as the Mother of Confederation. She was the first Monarch under the 1867 Constitution and personally chose Ottawa as Canada's capital city. The political leaders who brought the other provinces into Confederation after 1867 are also referred to as "Fathers of Confederation".

Caribbean Community
Errol Barrow (Barbados: 1920–1987); Forbes Burnham (Guyana: 1923–1985); Michael Manley (Jamaica: 1924–1997); and Eric Williams (Trinidad and Tobago: 1911–1981) were the leaders who brought forth regional integration among the Caribbean Community.

Chile

Bernardo O'Higgins (1778–1842) and José Miguel Carrera (1785–1821) are usually considered the founders of Chile. Diego Portales (1793–1837) is sometimes considered due to his influence in the 1833 Constitution.

Colombia
Simón Bolívar, was founder of Gran Colombia, which also included Panama, Ecuador, and Venezuela. Francisco de Paula Santander wrote the first constitution of Colombia. Antonio Nariño ("Precursor of the Independence") and Camilo Torres were the most relevant statesmen of the First Republic.

Costa Rica
Juan Mora Fernández, first Head of State of Costa Rica. José María Castro Madriz, First President of the Republic and proclaimed "Founder of the Republic" by Congress Juan Rafael Mora Porras, President during Costa Rica's campaign against William Walker, proclaimed "Hero and Liberator" by Congress.

Cuba
Carlos Manuel de Céspedes is considered the Cuban Founding Father. In 1868 he freed his slaves and declared the independence of Cuba, which began the Ten Years' War (1868–1878).

José Martí is a Cuban national hero.

Modern day Cuba was shaped by Fidel Castro with help from Che Guevara during the Cuban Revolution.

Dominica
Patrick John served as first Prime Minister of Dominica from 1978 to 1979.

Dominican Republic

Matías Ramón Mella (1816–1864), Juan Pablo Duarte (1813–1876) and Francisco del Rosario Sánchez (1817–1861) are considered the Fathers of the Country. Duarte is featured on the $1 coin and on the now discontinued $1 bill; Sanchez on the $5 coin and on the also discontinued $5 bill; Mella on the $10 coin and on the also discontinued $10 bill.

Ecuador

El Salvador
José Matías Delgado is considered to be the "Father of the Salvadoran Fatherland".

Grenada
Eric Gairy served as head of government of Grenada from 1967 to 1979. Independence from United Kingdom was achieved in 1974.

Guatemala

Guyana

Haiti

Toussaint Louverture (1743–1803) and Jean-Jacques Dessalines (1758–1806) were revolutionary and early political leaders of Haiti. Henri Christophe and Alexandre Pétion were also important figures of early Haiti.

Honduras
Founders of the Honduran Nation are José Cecilio del Valle (1777–1834), Dionisio de Herrera (1781–1850), Francisco Morazán (1792–1842), José Trinidad Reyes (1797–1855), and José Trinidad Cabañas (1805–1871).

Jamaica
Norman Manley is particularly noted for his role in securing universal suffrage for the country's population in 1944 along with founding the People's National Party. Manley also served as Chief Minister of Jamaica from 1955 to 1962. Alexander Bustamante was an influential union leader and as founder of the Jamaican Labour Party. Bustamante served as the then colony's first Chief Minister from 1953 to 1955 and later went on to lead Jamaica to independence from the United Kingdom in 1962, becoming the country's first Prime Minister.

Mexico
According to the decrees of the Congress of the Union of Mexico issued in 1822 and 1823, the Mexican founders are Miguel Hidalgo y Costilla (1753–1811), Ignacio Allende (1769–1811), Juan Aldama (1774–1811), Mariano Abasolo (1783–1816), José María Morelos (1765–1815), Mariano Matamoros (1770–1814), Leonardo Bravo (1764–1812), Miguel Bravo (unknown–1814), Hermenegildo Galeana (1762–1814), Mariano Jiménez (1781–1811), Xavier Mina (1789–1817), Pedro Moreno (1775–1817), and Víctor Rosales (1776–1817).

Nine of the thirteen founders are buried in the Monument to Independence in Mexico City.

Nicaragua

José Anacleto Ordóñez (1778–1839) is recognised as the "First Popular Caudillo of Nicaragua", as he led the state to independence by revolting against the pro Mexican government in 1823. Later he served as Head of State of Nicaragua within the Federal Republic of Central America.

José Núñez (1800–1880) and Joaquín del Cossío (1789–unknown) were the most important figures in Nicaragua's Independence, as they started the first and second transitional governments that declared to the State's Independence from the FRCA in 1838.

Fruto Chamorro (1804–1855) is considered as "Founder of the Republic", as he initiated the 1854 Constitution which formally declared Nicaragua a Republic.

Panama

Paraguay
Gaspar Rodríguez de Francia is considered the founder of Paraguay. He was named perpetual dictator as of the country's formation.

Peru
José de San Martín and Simón Bolívar led Peru to independence and forged the country.

Pachacuti, the 9th Sapa Inca of the Kingdom of Cusco, is the founder of the Inca Empire.

Saint Kitts and Nevis

Saint Lucia

Saint Vincent and the Grenadines

South America

José de San Martín, Simón Bolívar, Antonio José de Sucre, Francisco de Paula Santander, Francisco de Miranda have been referred to as the founding fathers of the region comprising modern day Argentina, Chile, Venezuela, Colombia, Peru, Ecuador, Bolivia and Panama.

Suriname
Johan Ferrier served as first President of Suriname from 1975 to 1980.

Trinidad and Tobago
Eric Williams served as first Prime Minister of Trinidad and Tobago from 1962 to 1981.

Uruguay
José Gervasio Artigas is considered to be the founder of Uruguay. He was a staunch democrat and federalist, opposed to monarchism and centralism.

United States

Within the large group known as "the Founding Fathers", there are two key subsets, the Signers (who signed the Declaration of Independence in 1776) and the Framers (who were delegates to the Federal Convention and took part in framing or drafting the proposed Constitution of the United States).  Some historians have suggested a revised definition of the "Founding Fathers", including a significantly broader group of not only the Signers and the Framers but also all those who, whether as politicians, jurists, statesmen, soldiers, diplomats, and ordinary citizens took part in winning U.S. independence and creating the United States of America. Eminent American historian Richard B. Morris, in his 1973 book Seven Who Shaped Our Destiny: The Founding Fathers as Revolutionaries, identified the following seven figures as the key founders: John Adams, Benjamin Franklin, Alexander Hamilton, John Jay, Thomas Jefferson, James Madison, and George Washington.

Venezuela
Simón Bolívar (1783–1830) is considered to be the founder not only of Venezuela, but of many of the region's countries as the Gran Colombia, which also included Panama, Ecuador, and Colombia and Bolivia. José Antonio Páez led the separation of Venezuela from the Gran Colombia and formed the modern statehood of the country. Scholars credit president Rómulo Betancourt as the founding father of modern democratic Venezuela, and Hugo Chávez as the founding father of modern totalitarian Venezuela.

Asia

Afghanistan

Ahmad Shah Durrani (1723–1773) unified the Afghan tribes and founded Afghanistan in 1747. His mausoleum is next to the Shrine of the Cloak in Kandahar, Afghanistan, where he is fondly known as Ahmad Shah Baba (Ahmad Shah the Father). However, the founding father of modernized Afghanistan is Mohammad Zahir Shah, the last King of Afghanistan. Due to this, the Afghan parliament gave him the title of "Father of the Nation."

Armenia
 Hayk Nahapet is considered the traditional founder of Armenia to which he gave his namesake (Hayk/Hayastan) and occasionally as the ancestor to all Armenians. He was explained in the Movses Khorenatsi book "History of Armenia (book) to have established Armenia as a home for his people around Lake Van where Hayk and his people battled with and were then free from the tyranny of the Neo Assyrian Empire and Nimrod in 2492 BC.
 Aram Manukian is considered the founder of the First Republic of Armenia.

Azerbaijan
Mammad Amin Rasulzade (Azerbaijani: Məhəmməd Əmin Axund Hacı Molla Ələkbər oğlu Rəsulzadə, Turkish: Mehmed Emin Resulzâde; (1884–1955) was an Azerbaijani statesman, scholar, public figure and one of the founding political leaders of Azerbaijan Republic (1918–1920). His expression "Bir kərə yüksələn bayraq, bir daha enməz!" ("The flag once raised will never fall!") became the motto of the independence movement in Azerbaijan in the 20th century.

Bahrain
Khalifa bin Salman Al Khalifa served as first Prime Minister of Bahrain from 1970 to 2020. Independence from United Kingdom was achieved in 1971.

Bangladesh

 The first Sultan of Bengal, Shamsuddin Ilyas Shah, is often credited for unifying the Bengal region (which he named Bangalah) under a single politico-social and linguistic identity (Bangali people) in 1352.
 Sheikh Mujibur Rahman, known with the honorary title Bangabandhu, is considered by many as the founding father of Bangladesh. He led Bengali nation to the decade long struggle for independence against then autocratic rule of Pakistan, finally resulting in the Bangladesh Liberation War and the independence of Bangladesh in 1971.
 Abul Kasem Fazlul Huq, Huseyn Shaheed Suhrawardy and Abdul Hamid Khan Bhashani are considered as three primary founders of Bangladesh, who shaped the Bengali nationalism since the days of British rule.

Apart from the founding leaders, the four key members of the Liberation Wartime government vice-president Syed Nazrul Islam, prime minister Tajuddin Ahmad, finance minister Muhammad Mansur Ali and home minister Abul Hasnat Muhammad Qamaruzzaman (altogether known as 'Four National Leaders') and the Liberation Wartime armed forces chief Muhammad Ataul Gani Osmani are hailed as vital figures in Bangladesh's independence.

Bhutan
Shabdrung Ngawang Namgyal (1594–1651) fled Tibet and unified the fiefdoms of Bhutan. He established the dual system of shared power between secular and Buddhist leadership that continues as a tradition to the present.

Brunei

Cambodia
Kaundinya I was the founder of ancient Khmer Funan.

Jayavarman II (770 – 850) was the founder of Khmer Empire.

China

The Yellow Thearch is revered as the legendary initiator of Chinese civilization, one of the cradles of civilization.

Yu the Great is conventionally regarded as having inaugurated dynastic rule in China by establishing the Xia dynasty, the first orthodox dynasty of China, in circa 2070 BC.

In 221 BC, the State of Qin completed the conquest of the various Chinese kingdoms of the Warring States period and formed the first unified Chinese empire, the Qin dynasty.

Sun Yat-sen was the founding father of the Republic of China and served as its first provisional president.

Mao Zedong is regarded as the founder of the People's Republic of China, even though the state has yet to officially confer the title "Father of the Nation" upon anyone.

Cyprus
Makarios III (1913–1977), archbishop and primate of the autocephalous Eastern Orthodox Church of Cyprus (1950–1977), and first president of Cyprus (1960–1977), is widely regarded by Greek Cypriots as the Father of the Nation or "Ethnarch".

Conversely, Rauf Denktaş (1924–2012), under Makarios III second and last Vice President of Cyprus (1973–1974), and first President of Northern Cyprus (1983–2005), is considered the founding father of Northern Cyprus.

East Timor
Mari Alkatiri served as Prime Minister of East Timor from 2002 to 2006.

India

Mahatma Gandhi (1869–1948) is considered the father of the nation and one of the most prominent leaders of the Indian independence movement. He is regarded as the founder of the modern Republic of India. He is featured on the Indian rupee.

Indonesia

Sukarno and Mohammad Hatta are the founders of Indonesia. They both signed the Proclamation of Independence which then read by Sukarno, proclaiming the independence of Indonesia from the Netherlands on 17 August 1945. A day later, they were elected respectively as the first President and Vice President of Indonesia. As the Netherlands did not recognize the independence, both of them were prominent figures and were seen as symbol of unity among Indonesian people to fight against Dutch during the National Revolution from 1945 to 1949. In August 1949, Hatta headed a delegation to The Hague for a Round Table Conference which then led to the recognition of Indonesian independence by the Netherlands on 23 December 1949.

In the early days of its formal independence, Indonesia published a series of stamps that paired several local personage with American founding fathers and former presidents. They are: Sukarno paired with George Washington, for their leadership during the initial stage of independence; Mohammad Hatta paired with Abraham Lincoln, for their democratic ideals; Haji Agus Salim paired with Benjamin Franklin, for their foreign diplomacy; Alexander Andries Maramis paired with Alexander Hamilton, for their contribution in the country financial matters; and Sutan Sjahrir paired with Thomas Jefferson, for their political marvels.

Iran (Persia)
Cyrus the Great (600–530 BC) was the founder of the First Persian Empire under the Achaemenid dynasty. Many Iranians gather at his tomb in Pasargadae annually on the Cyrus the Great Day and Nowruz, the Persian New Year. Prior to the 1979 Revolution the 2,500th year of Foundation of Imperial State of Iran took place. It consisted of an elaborate set of festivities that took place on 12–16 October 1971 on the occasion of the 2,500th anniversary of the founding of the Imperial State of Iran and First Persian Empire by Cyrus the Great. The intent of the celebration was to demonstrate Iran's old civilization and history to showcase its contemporary advancements under Mohammad Reza Pahlavi, the last Shah of Iran.
Ruhollah Khomeini is considered the founder of the modern Islamic State of Iran.

Israel
Theodor Herzl is considered the founder of Israel's founding ideology known as Zionism. David Ben-Gurion was the first Prime Minister of Israel, and considered an important figure in the creation of the state of Israel.

Japan
 (traditional reign 660–585 BC) was the first Emperor of Japan, according to the traditional order of succession. The Japanese national holiday  is celebrated annually on 11 February in commemoration of the founding of the nation of Japan and the ascension of Emperor Jimmu to the imperial throne.

Jordan 
Abdullah bin Al-Hussain was the founder and ruler of the Jordanian realm from 11 April 1921 until his assassination on the 20th of July 1951. He was the Emir of Transjordan, a British protectorate, until 25 May 1946, after which he was the king of an independent Jordan. He was a 38th-generation direct descendant of Muhammad, as he belongs to the Hashemite family.

Kazakhstan  

There is no law in the country which officially recognizes a single individual as the "Father of the Nation". Either title may be associated with any of the following prominent historical persons, owing to their impact on the country during their respective times.

Alikhan Bukeikhanov (1866–1937) was a Kazakh statesman, politician, publicist, teacher, writer and environmental scientist. He was leader and founder of the Alash Orda national liberation movement. He sided with the westernizers in the Kazakh political scene who were promoting the idea of the Western culture into the Kazakh steppe. In 1920, after the establishment of Soviet hegemony, Bukeikhanov joined the Bolshevik party and returned to scientific life. His earlier political activities caused the authorities to view him with suspicion, leading to arrests in 1926 and 1928. In 1926, Bukeikhanov was arrested on the charge of counter-revolutionary activity and put into Butyrka prison in Moscow. But due to the lack of evidence in the criminal case against him, he was released from prison. In 1930, the authorities banished him to Moscow, where he was arrested a final time in 1937 and executed.

Dinmukhamed Kunayev (1912–1993) was a Kazakh Soviet communist politician. He became first secretary of the Central Committee of the Communist Party of Kazakhstan again in 1964 when Khrushchev was ousted and replaced by Brezhnev. He kept his position for twenty-two more years. He was an alternate member of the Politburo from 1967, and a full member from 1971 to 1987. During Kunayev's long rule, Kazakhs occupied prominent positions in the bureaucracy, economy and educational institutions. A Brezhnev loyalist, he was removed from office under pressure from Mikhail Gorbachev, who accused him of corruption. On 16 December 1986 the Politburo replaced him with Gennady Kolbin, who had never lived in the Kazakh SSR before. This provoked street riots in Almaty, which were the first signs of ethnic strife during Gorbachev's tenure. In modern Kazakhstan, this revolt is called Jeltoqsan, meaning December in Kazakh.

Nursultan Nazarbayev was elected the nation's first president following its independence from the Soviet Union in December 1991. In 2010 Parliament of Kazakhstan named him Елбасы (Elbasy) which means "Leader of the Nation".

North Korea
Kim Il-sung was the founder of North Korea. He ruled from 1948 to 1994.

Kuwait
The first recorded ruler of Kuwait was Sheikh Abu Salman Sabah. However, Sheikh Mubarak Al-Kabir is known as the founder of the modern state of Kuwait. He was instrumental in moving the country away from the Ottoman Empire and toward British influence.

Kyrgyzstan
Askar Akayev served as first post-Soviet President of Kyrgyzstan from 1990 to 2005.

Laos
Fa Ngum is widely considered a founding father of the Lao people. In present day Laos, Kaysonne Phomvihane and Prince Souphanouvoung are considered the fathers of the Marxist-Leninist state.

Lebanon
Bechara El Khoury and Riad El Solh served as the first president and the first Prime Minister respectively of Lebanon after the French mandate in 1943.

Malaysia

Tunku Abdul Rahman (1903–1990) usually known as "the Tunku" (a princely title in Malaysia), and also called Bapa Kemerdekaan (Father of Independence) or Bapa Malaysia (Father of Malaysia), was Chief Minister of the Federation of Malaya from 1955, and the country's first Prime Minister from independence in 1957. He remained Prime Minister after Sabah, Sarawak, and Singapore joined in 1963 to form Malaysia.

Mongolia

Genghis Khan (c. 1162–1227), who by uniting the nomadic tribes founded the Mongol Empire, is generally regarded as the father of modern-day Mongolia. Although downcast during the communist-era, Genghis Khan's reputation surged after the democratic revolution in 1990.

Myanmar
Anawrahta is considered to be founder of ancient Burmese Kingdom of Pagan.

General Aung San is the founder of modern Burma (also known as Myanmar). Although he did not live to see the country's independence, he is credited in forming the basic structure of the independence movement and government. Aung San started his political career in 1930 as the editor of Rangoon University's newspaper – where he accused one of the colonial administrators in Burma of misconduct. In late 1940 he went to Japanese controlled Taiwan and Xiamen to receive military training, and he led the Burma Independence Army, spearheading the Japanese invasion of Burma. Later, he switched sides to the Allies, and helped in the Burma campaign. After the war, he was appointed to the government of a returning British administration, and was able to negotiate Burma's independence. He helped organized the Panglong Agreement in February 1947, achieving independence for all Burmese territories. However, on Saturday, 19 July 1947, Aung San, along with his cabinet ministers, was assassinated at the secretariat building in Rangoon.

U Nu served as first Prime Minister of Myanmar from 1948 to 1956.

General Ne Win was one of the founders of Tatmadaw. On 1962, 15 years after the independence, he led a military coup that brought him to power. Ne Win established the Burmese Way to Socialism which ruled Burma for 26 years.

Nepal

Prithvi Narayan Shah was largely responsible for the unification of Nepal, and is considered to be the founder of Nepal. His vision of ruling over a unified Nepal is said to have started when atop a hill near Nepa Valley (Present day Kathmandu), he decided he would like to rule over it. His strategic plan was very successful and his successors continued to build on his progress. Prithvi Narayan Shah's descendants continued to rule over Nepal for a total of 240 years before the 2006 democracy movement in Nepal toppled the constitutional power exercised by King Gyanendra, before abolishing the monarchy in 2008.

Oman

Pakistan

Pakistan's founder is Muhammad Ali Jinnah, who is hailed as Quaid-e-Azam or "Great Leader" and Baba-e-Qaum or Father of Nation. He founded not only the Islamic Republic of Pakistan but is credited for creating an entirely new nation state. Other prominent founders include the poet Muhammad Iqbal or spiritual Father, believed to be the first person to propagate the idea of a state for India's Muslims, Fatima Jinnah (Mother of nation) and members of Pakistan's first Cabinet such as Liaquat Ali Khan, A. K. Fazlul Huq, Abdul Rab Nishtar, Malik Feroze Khan Noon, Khwaja Nazimuddin and I. I. Chundrigar. Some historians credit the Muslim reformist Sir Syed Ahmad Khan as a founder of Pakistan because he provided the Two-Nation Theory which played a central role in the perception of Pakistan and its Muslim nationalist ideology largely based on Iqbal's philosophy and views.

Palestine
Palestinian political leader Yasser Arafat has been considered by some commentators as being the "founding father" of Palestine. Born in 1929 in Cairo, Egypt, Arafat soon became a supporter of Arab nationalism and anti-Zionism; in the 1948 Arab–Israeli War, he fought alongside the Muslim Brotherhood against the newly independent State of Israel. From 1969 until 2004, he served as the chairman of the Palestine Liberation Organization (PLO), a Palestinian nationalist organization which engaged in a numerous guerrilla conflicts with the Israel Defense Forces (IDF) during the second half of the 20th century. Beginning from 1983 onwards, Arafat based himself in Tunisia and switched to a tactic of negotiating with the Israeli government, acknowledging Israel's right to exist in a UN resolution and supporting a two-state solution to the Israeli–Palestinian conflict. Arafat engaged in a series of negotiations with the Israeli government to end the conflict between it and the PLO, including the Madrid Conference of 1991, the 1993 Oslo Accords and the 2000 Camp David Summit. In 1994, he returned to Palestine and promoted self-government for the Palestinian territories, receiving the Nobel Peace Prize the same year. Among Palestinians, Arafat is viewed as a martyr who symbolized the national aspirations of his people.

Philippines

There is no law in the Philippines which officially recognizes any single individual as the "Father of the Nation". Either title may be associated with any of the following prominent historical persons, owing to their impact on the country during their respective times: José Rizal (1861–1896) was a Filipino nationalist during the tail end of the Spanish colonial period of the Philippines. An ophthalmologist by profession, Rizal became a writer and a key member of the Filipino Propaganda Movement which advocated political reforms for the colony under Spain. He was executed by the Spanish colonial government for the crime of rebellion after an anti-colonial revolution, inspired in part by his writings, broke out. Though he was not actively involved in its planning or conduct, he ultimately approved of its goals which eventually led to Philippine independence. He is widely considered one of the greatest heroes of the Philippines, and is implied by Philippine law to be one of the national heroes. He was the author of the novels Noli Me Tángere, and El Filibusterismo, and a number of poems and essays. Andrés Bonifacio (1863–1897) De facto President and a leader during the Philippine Revolution in 1896, which saw armed resistance against the Spanish Empire. Emilio Aguinaldo (1869–1964) Leader of the latter part of the Philippine Revolution and first president of the Philippines through the 1899 Malolos Congress, which oversaw the promulgation of the Malolos Constitution. Manuel Roxas served as first President of independent Philippines from 1946 to 1948.

Qatar

Saudi Arabia

King Abdulaziz Al Saud, also known as Ibn Saud, is the founding father of the Kingdom of Saudi Arabia. He served as first King from 1932 to 1953.

Singapore

Lee Kuan Yew (1923–2015), often referred to by his initials "LKY", was the first prime minister of the Republic of Singapore, governing for three decades, from 1959 to 1990. Lee has helped to built the economy from a third world country to a first world country and turned Singapore into a metropolis after the separation from Malaysia in 1965.

South Korea

Syngman Rhee was the first president and founding father of South Korea at the time of the establishment of the country in 1948. Before the foundation of South Korea, there have been many founders throughout history such as Lee Seonggye, Taejo Wang Geon, and Dongmyeong the great. Dangun, the legendary first king of Gojoseon, is venerated in both Koreas as the founder of the Korean nation and peoples.

Sri Lanka
 Prince Vijaya is considered to be the first King of Sri Lanka with King Dutugemunu honored as the first king to unify Sri Lanka. D. S. Senanayake (1883–1952) is widely known as the modern (post independence) father of the nation. William Gopallawa (1896–1981) was the first Constitutional President while J. R. Jayewardene (1906–1996) was the first Executive President.

Syria

Tajikistan

Thailand
Si Inthrathit (1238 - 1270) was the founder of Sukhothai Kingdom, the first Thai kingdom.

Naresuan (1590–1605), who retook most of Siam from the Burmese

King Taksin the Great (1734–1782), who reunited Siam following the collapse of the Ayutthaya Kingdom.

Rama I (1737–1809), founder of the Rattanakosin Kingdom and the first monarch of the reigning Chakri dynasty of Siam.

Turkey

Alp Arslan (1029–1072) was the second Sultan of the Seljuk Empire. He greatly expanded the Seljuk territory and consolidated his power, defeating rivals to the south and northwest, and his victory over the Byzantines at the Battle of Manzikert, in 1071, ushered in the Turkoman settlement of Anatolia.

Osman I (1258–1324), was the leader of the Kayi tribe and the founder of the Ottoman dynasty.
 
Mehmed the Conqueror (1432–1481), was an Ottoman sultan who ruled from August 1444 to September 1446, and then later from February 1451 to May 1481. When he ascended the throne again in 1451 he strengthened the Ottoman navy and made preparations to attack Constantinople. At the age of 21, he conquered Constantinople (modern-day Istanbul) and brought an end to the Byzantine Empire.

Mahmud II (1785–1839) was the 30th Sultan of the Ottoman Empire from 1808 until his death in 1839. His reign is recognized for the extensive administrative, military, and fiscal reforms he instituted, which culminated in the Decree of Tanzimat ("reorganization"). Mahmud's reforms included the 1826 abolition of the conservative Janissary corps, which removed a major obstacle to his and his successors' reforms in the Empire. The reforms he instituted were characterized by political and social changes, which would eventually lead to the birth of the modern Turkish Republic.

Mustafa Kemal Atatürk (1881–1938) was the founder and first president of the Republic of Turkey. Following the First World War, the huge conglomeration of territories and peoples that formerly comprised the Ottoman Empire was divided into several new states. The Turkish War of Independence (1919–1923), initiated by Mustafa Kemal Atatürk and his colleagues in Anatolia, resulted in the establishment of the modern Republic of Turkey (Türkiye Cumhuriyeti) in 1923. He subsequently introduced many radical reforms with the aim of transforming the old multinational Ottoman state into a new secular republic.

Turkmenistan
Saparmurat Niyazov served as first post-Soviet President of Turkmenistan from 1990 to 2006.

United Arab Emirates
Initially independent emirates part of the Trucial states, Zayed bin Sultan Al Nahyan established the United Arab Emirates by joining the seven independent emirates into a federation.

Uzbekistan
Islam Karimov served as first post-Soviet President of Uzbekistan from 1991 to 2016.

Vietnam
Kinh Dương Vương – Lạc Long Quân and the Hùng Kings were the founders of the Hồng Bàng dynasty – the first dynasty of Vietnam and laid the foundation to form the country of Vietnam.

Yemen
Yahya Muhammad Hamid ed-Din ruled as first independent King of Mutawakkilite Kingdom of Yemen from 1918 to 1948.

Europe

Albania

 Gjergj Kastrioti Skanderbeg (1405 – 17 January 1468) was a medieval Albanian ruler from the House of Kastrioti who successfully fought against the Ottoman Empire during its peak. On 2 March 1444, Skanderbeg for the first time unified all the Albanian princes and lords in the League of Lezhë, thus, for the first time all of Albania was unified under one ruler. During his reign (1443–1468) he maintained the independence of Albania for 25 years. Skanderbeg is the national hero of the Albanians.
 Ismail Qemali (24 January 1844 – 26 January 1919) was a distinguished leader of the Albanian national movement at the beginning of the 20th century, founder of the modern Albanian state in 1912, and its first head of state and government.

Andorra
 The first Co-Princes of Andorra were Roger-Bernard III, Count of Foix and Pere d'Urtx, Bishop of Urgell, who signed the Paréage, which gave them joint sovereignty over Andorra in 1278.

Austria
 Karl Renner, who was the first Chancellor of Austria and the first post-war President of Austria after World War II, is often referred to as the "Father of the Republic" due to his leadership of the First Austrian Republic, and for playing a decisive role in establishing the present Second Austrian republic.

Belarus

Belgium
 Though there is no official founding father of Belgium, the leaders of the Belgian Revolution, Charles Rogier and Erasme Louis Surlet de Chokier, as well as the first King of the Belgians, Leopold I, were key figures in the independence of Belgium from the United Kingdom of the Netherlands.

Bosnia and Herzegovina

 Tvrtko I of Bosnia was the founder of the first Bosnian Kingdom.
 Husein-kapetan Gradaščević led the revolt against the Ottoman Sultan Mahmud II who fought for an autonomous Bosnian State.

Bulgaria
 Mythical rulers of Bulgaria date back as far as 3rd millennium BC.

Medieval
 Avitohol (?–453? AD), who researchers claim to be the mythical Attila, is the first name in the Nominalia of the Bulgarian khans. He was from the Dulo clan and was succeeded by his son Ernak or Irnik (the second name mentioned in the Nominalia);
 Kubrat (606–665) was the founder of the powerful Great Bulgaria in 632 AD;
 Asparuh (around 640–701) is the most venerated national founder of Bulgaria. He was a son of Kubrat and started attacking and moving southwest of Old Great Bulgaria, towards the Lower Danube in Southeast Europe. Victorious over the Eastern Roman Empire, he established the First Bulgarian Empire in 680–681. Modern day Bulgaria is a direct successor of this state. Asparukh's brother Batbayan stayed ruling the core territories to the north, while Kotrag migrated further north and founded Volga Bulgaria;
 Krum the Fearsome (8th century – 814) – prominent ruler of the First Bulgarian Empire. During his reign the Bulgarian territory doubled in size, spreading from the middle Danube to the Dnieper and from Odrin to the Tatra Mountains. His able and energetic rule brought law and order to Bulgaria and developed the rudiments of state organization, thus he is regarded as an important national founder.
 Boris I (9th century-2 May 907) officially Christianized Bulgaria in 864, a significant event that shaped the History of Bulgaria and Europe. The historian Steven Runciman called him one of the greatest persons in history. His son and grandson, tsar Simeon I the Great and tsar Petar I, are also considered as having an important role in the formation and strengthening of the Bulgarian state and nationality;
 Samuil (997–1014) – energetic emperor (tsar) that restored Bulgarian might in Southeast Europe, and although the Empire was disestablished after his death, he is regarded as a heroic ruler in Bulgaria, as well as in North Macedonia;
 Ivan Asen I, Peter IV and Kaloyan are the three brothers tsars that reestablished Bulgaria after a major uprising (1185–1204);
 Euthymius of Tarnovo – Patriarch of Bulgaria between 1375 and 1393. Regarded as one of the most important figures of medieval Bulgaria, Euthymius was the last head of the Bulgarian Orthodox Church in the Second Bulgarian Empire. Arguably the best esteemed of all Bulgarian patriarchs, Euthymius was an authoritative figure in the Eastern Orthodox world of the time.

Modern

 Petar Bogdan (1601–1674)
 Paisius of Hilendar (1722–1773)
 Petar Beron (1799–1871))
 Georgi Rakovski (1821–1867)
 Dragan Tsankov (1828–1911)
 Lyuben Karavelov (1834–1879)
 Vasil Levski (1837–1873)
 Ekzarh Yosif (1840–1915)
 Vasil Drumev (1841–1901)
 Georgi Benkovski (1843–1876) 
 Petko Karavelov (1943–1903)
 Hristo Botev (1848–1876)
 Zahari Stoyanov (1850–1889)
 Ivan Vazov (1850–1921)
 Stefan Stambolov (1851–1895)

Croatia

 Višeslav was one of the first dukes of Croatia, and the early attested by name.
 Tomislav is celebrated as the first king of Croatia and the founder of the first united Croatian state.
 Ante Starčević, has been referred to as Father of the Nation due to his campaign for the rights of Croats within Austria-Hungary and his propagation of a Croatian state in a time where many politicians sought unification with other South Slavs.
 Franjo Tuđman, first President of the Republic of Croatia 1990–99. Sometimes referred to as and self-proclaimed "Father of the Nation".

Cyprus
Makarios III (1913–1977), archbishop and primate of the autocephalous Eastern Orthodox Church of Cyprus (1950–1977), and first president of Cyprus (1960–1977), is widely regarded by Greek Cypriots as the Father of the Nation or "Ethnarch".

Conversely, Rauf Denktaş (1924–2012), under Makarios III second and last Vice President of Cyprus (1973–1974), and first President of Northern Cyprus (1983–2005), is considered the founding father of Northern Cyprus.

Czechia
Czech, one of three mythical Slavic brothers who appear together in the Wielkopolska Chronicle, is considered the founder of the Czech nation.

Václav Havel (1936–2011), founder of the Civic Forum party that played a major role in the Velvet Revolution that in 1989 toppled the Communist system in Czechoslovakia, was the last (and first democratically-elected) president of Czechoslovakia from 1989 until the dissolution of Czechoslovakia in 1992, and the first president of the Czech Republic from 1993 to 2003.

Denmark

 Dan (king) (or Halfdan) is the name of the legendary earliest king of the Danes and Denmark, mentioned in medieval Scandinavian texts. He is said to be the progenitor of the nation and the Danish Royal House according to Saxo Grammaticus's Gesta Danorum.
 Gorm the Old, the first recorded ruler of Denmark, reigning from c.  936 to his death c.  958. The current Queen Margrethe II of Denmark can trace her heritage back to Gorm the Old. He is called the founder of the kingdom of Denmark, though at the time he did not control the whole country, only Jutland.
 Harald Bluetooth was the son of Gorm the old and the first to unite Denmark into a single country by uniting the tribes. Harald ruled as king of Denmark from c. 958 – c. 986. He was baptized and the first Christian king of Denmark and helped Christianize the Danes, which is proclaimed on the Jelling stone. 
 Niels Ebbesen was a Danish squire and national hero who liberated Denmark, which had been patented away to German barons and landlords. He is known for his killing of Gerhard III, Count of Holstein-Rendsburg in 1340, and in doing so returning control of Jutland and Funen back to the Danish king.

Estonia
Edgar Savisaar served as first post-Soviet Prime Minister of Estonia from 1991 to 1992.

Finland
Pehr Evind Svinhufvud served as first Prime Minister of Finland from 1917 to 1918.

France
 Vercingetorix: he united the Gauls in a revolt against Roman forces during the last phase of Julius Caesar's Gallic Wars.
Clovis I: King of the Salian Franks (481–509), King of the Franks (509–511); united all the Frankish tribes in Gaul and gave them a common Catholic religion.
Charlemagne: King of the Franks (768–814), Holy Roman Emperor (800–814), King of the Lombards (774–814); considered as a major founding figure of Europe.
Napoleon I: First Consul of France (1799–1804), first President of the Italian Republic (1802–1805), King of Italy (1805–1814), Emperor of the French (1804–1814); founded the First French Empire and established many modern French institutions.
 Louis-Napoléon Bonaparte, later known as Emperor Napoleon III (1852–1870) was the first French President (1848–1852). He was the last Monarch of France.
Charles de Gaulle is a hero of the French resistance to Germany during World War II, and the founder and first president (1959–1969) of the Fifth French Republic.

Georgia
Pharnavaz I (329—237 BC), 1st monarch of the Kingdom of Iberia
Bagrat III (960—1014), 1st monarch of the united Kingdom of Georgia
Noe Ramishvili (1881—1930), 1st Prime Minister of the Democratic Republic of Georgia 
Zviad Gamsakhurdia (1939—1993), 1st President of Georgia

Germany

Before the national unification of Germany in 1871, German nationalists sought out multiple legendary founders of the German nation, such as Arminius, Charlemagne and – as championed by Friedrich Ludwig Jahn and Richard Wagner – Henry the Fowler.
Otto von Bismarck (1815–1898), the "Iron Chancellor", engineered the unification of the numerous states of Germany in 1871.
Modern, democratic Germany was decisively shaped by the "Fathers of the Basic Law" in the 1948 Constitutional Convention at Herrenchiemsee, and by the first German Chancellor, Konrad Adenauer.
For reunified Germany, the slogan "Wir sind das Volk!" ("We are the people!") became symbolic, thus making all Germans founders of modern Germany.

Greece

Ancient
 Hellen, mythical progenitor of the Greeks, who gives his name to both the people and the country in the Greek language.
 Theseus, semi-legendary founder-hero of Athens
 Solon (594 BC) and Cleisthenes (508/7 BC), inventors of democracy and founders of the Athenian constitution.
 Lycurgus of Sparta, founder of the Spartan constitution
 Cadmus, founder and first King of Thebes.

Modern
 Adamantios Korais, Theophilos Kairis and other figures of the Greek Enlightenment who contributed to the country's national awakening leading up to its revolution against the Ottoman Empire
 Rigas Feraios, writer and revolutionary who is remembered as a national hero and the first victim of the uprising against the Ottomans.
 Theodoros Kolokotronis, Georgios Karaiskakis, Andreas Vokos Miaoulis, Laskarina Bouboulina, Yannis Makriyannis and other military leaders of the Greek War of Independence
 Alexandros Mavrokordatos, President of the First National Assembly at Epidaurus, co-author of the Greek Declaration of Independence and first Provisional Constitution and first head of government (President of the Executive) of Modern Greece.
 Ioannis Kapodistrias, first head of state of independent Greece (1827–1831) and founder of the modern Greek state

Hungary
According to Anonymus the fejedelem who made the Magyars settle into the Carpathian Basin in 896 AD was Árpád. His dynasty reigned over the Hungarian Kingdom from the ninth century until 1301. In Hungary Stephen I of Hungary is commonly regarded as the founder of the nation. He was Hungary's first king and united the Magyar people into the Kingdom of Hungary. Amongst others, Lajos Kossuth is supposed to be the Pater Patriae. He is known as the leader of the Hungarian Revolution of 1848 against the Habsburgs, and therefore founder of the modern Hungarian Republic.

Iceland
Jón Sigurðsson was the leader of the 19th century Icelandic independence movement. He was the first president of the Althingi, restored as a legislative branch in 1875.

Ireland
The Irish Free State was established after the Irish War of Independence (1919–21), in which Éamon de Valera, Cathal Brugha and Michael Collins were key leaders. However, they became antagonists in the Irish Civil War (1922–23), in which Collins and Brugha were killed and de Valera defeated. For decades, the inheritors of the opposing factions bypassed these sensitivities to honour the earlier leaders of the Easter Rising of 1916, in particular the seven signatories of the Proclamation of the Irish Republic: Patrick Pearse, James Connolly, Éamonn Ceannt, Tom Clarke, Seán Mac Diarmada, Thomas MacDonagh, and Joseph Plunkett.

Italy

Ancient
 Romulus, founder of Rome, the capital of Italy
 Julius Caesar, great Roman general and dictator, extended Roman citizenship to the inhabitants Cisalpine Gaul
 Caesar Augustus organized Italia and the Italicus Populus during the Roman Empire.
 Constantine the Great, legalized Christianity and laid the foundation for the Christianisation of the Empire
 Alberto da Giussano, legendary warrior who defeated the Emperor Frederick Barbarossa at the Battle of Legnano, thus securing the independence of the Northern Italian Lombard League.

Modern Italy
 Napoleon Bonaparte was the first to use the title of President of the Italian Republic.
King Vittorio Emanuele II, Giuseppe Garibaldi, Prime Minister Camillo Benso, Count of Cavour, and Giuseppe Mazzini have been referred to as the "Four Fathers of the Fatherland". Italy was unified in 1861 and Rome became its capital in 1870.
 The members of the Assemblea Costituente (the Constituent Assembly of 1946–1947) are considered the "fathers" of the Italian Republic, which replaced the Monarchy after a referendum in 1946. Prominent members among them included Alcide De Gasperi (also counted among the founding fathers of the European Union), the communist Palmiro Togliatti and liberal Vittorio Emanuele Orlando, the "premier of victory" in WWI.

Kosovo

It is likely that the Kosovo Albanians regard Ibrahim Rugova as a key figure, since he was the one that brought an independence movement of Kosovo from the fall of Yugoslavia. Additionally, Rugova ruled Kosovo from the 1992 till 2006 as president of the nation, and ever since has been regarded as the National Hero of Kosovo, and led to further independence in 2008 from Serbia to which now 97 nations have recognised Kosovo as of September 2021.

Latvia
Most Latvians regard Kārlis Ulmanis, a key figure in the Latvian war of independence and four-times Prime Minister of Latvia, as being the founding father of modern Latvia.

Liechtenstein
Karl I became the first Prince of Liechtenstein in 1608.
 Hans-Adam I purchased the domain of Schellenberg and the county of Vaduz which would eventually form the modern day Lichtenstein.
 Johann I drafted the first constitution of Lichtenstein, in 1818.

Lithuania
The first and the only king (1251–1263) of Lithuania, Mindaugas, is seen as the founder of the Lithuanian state, as is commemorated on Statehood Day on 6 July.
Dr. Jonas Basanavičius, activist and proponent of the Lithuanian National Revival in the turn of the 19th century into the 20th, who participated in every major event leading to the independence of Lithuania, member of the Council of Lithuania which on 16 February 1918 declared Lithuania an independent state, is universally considered the "Patriarch of the Nation".

Luxembourg
Sigfried, Count of the Ardennes

Malta
 Anthony Mamo (1909–2008) was the first president of the Republic of Malta.

Moldova
 Stephen the Great
 Alexandru Lăpușneanu

Monaco
 François Grimaldi became the first Lord of Monaco when he captured the Rock of Monaco in 1297.
 Honoré II, Prince of Monaco secured recognition of independent sovereignty from Spain in 1633, and then from France by signing the Treaty of Péronne in 1641.

Montenegro

 Petar I Petrović-Njegoš (1747–1830) acquired de facto independence for Montenegro from the Ottoman Empire and created the first Montenegrin law in modern era

Netherlands
Prince William I of Orange (1533–1584) or William the Silent, is known as the father of the Netherlands. He led the Dutch in their Revolt against Spain for their independence. Today he is often called Vader des Vaderlands ("Father of the Fatherland").

North Macedonia
Kiro Gligorov (first president of independent Macedonia).

Norway
King Harald Fairhair, who unified Norway and ruled c. 872–930, is often considered the founder of the nation.

Usually the Norwegian Constituent Assembly at Eidsvoll in 1814, consisting of 112 men from most of the country, in Norway often referred to as Eidsvoll Men or the Fathers of the Constitution.

Poland

Legendary:

 Lech, legendary first leader of Polans tribe.

Kingdom of Poland and Rzeczpospolita Obojga Narodów:

 Mieszko I (c. 920/45–992), the first historical ruler of Poland, Mieszko I is considered the de facto creator of the Polish state. He was a Duke of the Polans from about 960 until his death. Mieszko I's marriage in 965 to the Přemyslid princess Dobrawa and his baptism in 966 put him and his country in the cultural sphere of Western Christianity. According to existing sources, Mieszko I was a wise politician, a talented military leader and charismatic ruler. He successfully used diplomacy, concluding an alliance with Bohemia first, and then with Sweden and the Holy Roman Empire. In foreign policy, he placed the interests of his country foremost, even entering into agreements with former enemies. On his death, he left to his sons a country of greatly expanded territory, with a well-established position in Europe. Mieszko I also appeared as "Dagome" in a papal document from about 1085, called "Dagome iudex", which mentions a gift or dedication of Mieszko's land to the Pope (the act took place almost a hundred years earlier).
 Bolesław I Chrobry (967–1025), was Duke of Poland from 992 to 1025, and the first King of Poland in 1025. He was the son of Mieszko I of Poland by his wife, Dobrawa of Bohemia. He supported the missionary views of Adalbert, Bishop of Prague, and Bruno of Querfurt. The martyrdom of Adalbert in 997 and his imminent canonization were used to consolidate Poland's autonomy from the Holy Roman Empire. This perhaps happened most clearly during the Congress of Gniezno (11 March 1000), which resulted in the establishment of a Polish church structure with a Metropolitan See at Gniezno. This See was independent of the German Archbishopric of Magdeburg, which had tried to claim jurisdiction over the Polish church. Following the Congress of Gniezno, bishoprics were also established in Kraków, Wrocław and Kołobrzeg, and Bolesław formally repudiated paying tribute to the Holy Roman Empire. In the summer of 1018, in one of his expeditions, Bolesław I captured Kiev, where he installed his son-in-law Sviatopolk I as ruler. According to legend, Bolesław chipped his sword when striking Kiev's Golden Gate. Later, in honor of this legend, a sword called Szczerbiec ("Jagged Sword") would become the coronation sword of Poland's kings. Bolesław I was a remarkable politician, strategist, and statesman. He not only turned Poland into a country comparable to older western monarchies, but he raised it to the front rank of European states. Bolesław conducted successful military campaigns in the west, south and east. He consolidated Polish lands and conquered territories outside the borders of modern-day Poland, including Slovakia, Moravia, Red Ruthenia, Meissen, Lusatia, and Bohemia. He was a powerful mediator in Central European affairs. Finally, as the culmination of his reign, in 1025 he had himself crowned King of Poland. He was the first Polish ruler to receive the title of rex (Latin: "king").

 Władysław II Jagiełło (c. 1352/1362 – 1434) was the Grand Duke of Lithuania (1377–1434) and then the King of Poland (1386–1434), first alongside his wife Jadwiga until 1399, and then sole King of Poland. He ruled in Lithuania from 1377. Born a pagan, in 1386 he converted to Catholicism and was baptized as Władysław in Kraków, married the young Queen Jadwiga, and was crowned King of Poland as Władysław II Jagiełło. In 1387 he converted Lithuania to Christianity. His own reign in Poland started in 1399, upon the death of Queen Jadwiga, and lasted a further thirty-five years and laid the foundation for the centuries-long Polish–Lithuanian union. The dynasty ruled both states until 1572, and became one of the most influential dynasties in late medieval and early modern Central and Eastern Europe. During his reign, the Polish-Lithuanian state was the largest state in the Christian world. The reign of Władysław II Jagiełło extended Polish frontiers and is often considered the beginning of Poland's Golden Age.
Zygmunt II August (1520–1572), was the King of Poland and Grand Duke of Lithuania, the only son of Sigismund I the Old, whom Sigismund II succeeded in 1548. In 1569 he oversaw the signing of the Union of Lublin between Poland and the Grand Duchy of Lithuania, which formed the Polish–Lithuanian Commonwealth and introduced an elective monarchy.
Tadeusz Kościuszko (1746–1817) was a Polish-Lithuanian military engineer, statesman, and military leader who became a national hero in Poland, Lithuania, Belarus, and the United States. He fought in the Polish–Lithuanian Commonwealth's struggles against Russia and Prussia, and on the U.S. side in the American Revolutionary War. As Supreme Commander of the Polish National Armed Forces, he led the 1794 Kościuszko Uprising.

Fathers of Polish Independence:

 Józef Piłsudski (1867–1935), was a Polish statesman who served as the Chief of State (1918–22) and First Marshal of Poland (from 1920). From World War I he had great power in Polish politics and was a distinguished figure on the international scene. He is viewed as a father of the Druga Rzeczpospolita Polska re-established in 1918, 123 years after the 1795 Partitions of Poland by Austria, Prussia and Russia.
Roman Dmowski (1864–1939), was a Polish politician, statesman, polyglot, and the leader of National Democracy movement. He was represented Poland at the Paris Peace Conference in 1919.
Ignacy Jan Paderewski (1860–1941), was a Polish pianist and composer, freemason, politician, statesman and spokesman for Polish independence. He was a favorite of concert audiences around the world. His musical fame opened access to diplomacy and the media. Paderewski played an important role in meeting with President Woodrow Wilson and obtaining the explicit inclusion of independent Poland as point 13 in Wilson's peace terms in 1918, called the Fourteen Points. He was the Prime Minister of Poland and also Poland's foreign minister in 1919, and represented Poland at the Paris Peace Conference in 1919.
Wojciech Konfanty (1873–1939), was a Polish activist, journalist and politician, who served as a member of the German parliaments, the Reichstag and the Prussian Landtag, and later, in the Polish Sejm. Briefly, he also was a paramilitary leader, known for organizing the Polish Silesian Uprisings in Upper Silesia, which after World War I was contested by Germany and Poland. Korfanty fought to protect Poles from discrimination and the policies of Germanisation in Upper Silesia before the war and sought to join Silesia to Poland after Poland regained its independence.
Wincenty Witos (1874–1945), was a Polish politic and the leader of the Polish Peasants' Movement. Witos was also a leader of Polish Liquidation Committee, formed in Kraków in 1918.
Ignacy Daszyński (1866–1936), was a Polish socialist politician, journalist, and Prime Minister of the Provisional People's Government of the Republic of Poland, formed in Lublin in 1918.
Józef Haller von Hallenburg (1873–1960) was a lieutenant general of the Polish Army, a legionary in the Polish Legions, harcmistrz (the highest Scouting instructor rank in Poland), the president of the Polish Scouting and Guiding Association (ZHP), and a political and social activist. After the Peace of Brest-Litovsk he arrived in France in July 1918, where on behalf of the Polish National Committee he created what was known as the Blue Army (from the color of its French uniforms, also known as Haller's Army). For the next few months his army, allied to the Entente, would fight against Germany.

Portugal
 Viriathus was the most important leader of the Lusitanian people that resisted Roman expansion into western Hispania or Iberia (as the Greeks called it). Today Viriathus is regarded as a national hero and an enduring symbol of Portuguese nationality and independence, portrayed by artists and celebrated by its people throughout the centuries.
 Henry of Burgundy (1066–1112), was appointed Count of Portugal as a reward for military services to Kingdom of León, and with the purpose of expanding the territory southwards. And, more importantly, his son, Count Afonso I of Portugal (1109–1185), a Templar Brother who took control of the county after Henry died and was recognized by the Holy See, in 1179, as the first King of Portugal, through the Manifestis Probatum bull.

Romania
 Burebista is considered the great king who unified all the Dacian tribes. He is also known for creating a powerful empire that stretched from west to the Adriatic Sea and Southern Germany, from east to the Black Sea, from north to Southern Poland and from south to Greek Macedonia and Eastern Thrace. He is considered by many Romanians as a national hero. The Dacian Kingdom under Burebista was the greatest territorial extent in Romania's history.
 Decebalus and Trajan are considered to be the fathers of the Romanian people, as Roman veterans were settled on the present-day territory of Romania following Trajan's Dacian Wars.
Basarab I the Founder (c. 1270-1351/1352) was the great voivode of Wallachia. Basarab either came into power between 1304 and 1324 by dethroning or peacefully succeeding the legendary founder of Wallachia, Radu Negru, or in 1310 by succeeding his father, Thocomerius. In 1330 he defeated Charles I of Hungary at the battle of Posada, and the first independent Romanian state was consequently founded. He founded the Basarab dynasty and his descendants ruled Wallachia for more than three centuries. From the middle of the 14th century, some foreign chronicles used derivations of his name: "Basarab", when referring to Wallachia. 
 Michael the Brave (1558–1601) was the Prince of Wallachia (1593–1601), Prince of Moldavia (1600) and de facto ruler of Transylvania (1599–1600). He is considered one of Romania's greatest national heroes. Since the 19th century, Michael the Brave has been regarded as a symbol of the unity of all Romanians, as his reign marked the first time all states mainly inhabited by Romanians were under the same ruler.
 Alexandru Ioan Cuza was elected as the first leader of the modern Romanian state. He presided over Wallachia and Moldavia in a personal union, which later became permanent even though he was forced to abdicate.
 Carol I was the first King of Romania that obtained the independence of the country.
 Ion C. Brătianu established the foundation of the modern Romanian State.
 Mihail Kogălniceanu established the foundation of the modern Romanian State.
 Ferdinand I was King of Romania when the country gained Transylvania and Bessarabia.

Russia
 Rurik, a Varangian prince and the legendary founder of the royal Rurikid dynasty, established the first Russian state in Novgorod the Great in 862.
 Ivan IV, known as Ivan the Terrible, Grand Prince of Moscow from the Rurikid dynasty, established the Tsardom of Muscovy and was proclaimed the first Tsar of Russia in 1547.
 Mikhail I of Russia was the first Tsar of Russia from the House of Romanov, elected to the throne by the Zemsky Sobor in 1613. His elevation marked the end of the period of political and civil strife known as the Time of Troubles. 
 Peter the Great, Tsar and then Emperor of Russia from the House of Romanov, founded Saint Petersburg in 1703 and established the Russian Empire in 1721, inaugurating the imperial period of Russian history that lasted until the February Revolution of 1917.
 Vladimir Lenin was the founder of Soviet Russia and later, the Soviet Union
 Boris Yeltsin was the first president of the Russian Federation as an independent state. He was first elected to the presidency in June 1991, while the Russian Federation was still a part of the USSR, and re-elected in 1996.

San Marino
Saint Marinus was the founder of the world's oldest surviving republic, San Marino, in 301. Tradition holds that he was a stonemason by trade who came from the island of Rab on the other side of the Adriatic Sea (modern Croatia), fleeing persecution for his Christian beliefs in the Diocletianic Persecution.

Serbia

 Stefan Nemanja, Grand Prince of Serbia (r. 1166–1196). The Serbian Church, under St. Sava, depicted Nemanja as the founder of Serbia.
 Karađorđe, Grand Leader (1804–1813), liberator of Serbia, organizer and leader of the Serbian Revolution.

The honorific Father of the Fatherland (Отац Отаџбине) has been given to Saint Sava, Karađorđe, and Miloš Obrenović, the latter having been given it by the National Assembly during his lifetime.

Slovakia
Many Slovaks see Great Moravia as their ancestors, which would make Mojmír I a founder.

Slovenia
France Bučar is a Slovenian politician, legal expert and author. Between 1990 and 1992, he served as the first chairman of the freely elected Slovenian Parliament. He was the one to formally declare the independence of Slovenia on 25 June 1991. He is considered one of the founders of Slovenian democracy and independence. He is also considered, together with Peter Jambrek, as the main author of the current Slovenian constitution. Jože Pučnik was president of DEMOS and one of the main persons in the Slovenian fight for independence. The largest Slovenian airport is named Letališče Jožeta Pučnika (Jože Pučnik airport). Lojze Peterle was first prime minister of Slovenia and Milan Kučan was the first president.

Spain

The Catholic Monarchs, Isabella of Castile and Ferdinand II of Aragon, unified Spain in the 15th century.  Both came from the noble House of Trastámara. Charles V, Holy Roman Emperor was the first to inherit the dynastic union and the first Habsburg monarch. His successor, Philip II of Spain, established a capital in Madrid. The first Bourbon King of Spain was Philip V of Spain, who is also responsible for the de jure unification of the country.

Sweden
While Sweden had existed as a monarchy of sorts long before his time, Birger Jarl, father of and regent for Valdemar, King of Sweden, can be said to have established Sweden as a nation. Birger was Jarl in the years 1248–66.

Gustav I of Sweden, who secured Sweden's independence from Denmark in 1523, is often considered a father of the nation.

Switzerland
Both the anonymous Eidgenossen who drew up the Federal Charter of 1291, or the liberal statesmen who helped found the modern Swiss Confederation in 1848 can be considered the founders of Switzerland. Among the latter, those who became the first members of the Swiss Federal Council were perhaps the most notable: Ulrich Ochsenbein, Jakob Stämpfli, Jonas Furrer, Josef Munzinger, Henri Druey, Friedrich Frey-Herosé, Wilhelm Matthias Naeff and Stefano Franscini.

Ukraine
Ukraine's historical roots can be traced back to Kievan Rus' in 879, with Volodymyr I as the Grand Prince of Kyiv.

After the 13th-century Mongol invasion devastated Kievan Rus', the principalities of Halych and Volodymyr-Volynskyi merged into the state of Galicia-Volhynia by Danylo Romanovych, who also reunited Galicia-Volhynia with the ancient capital of Kyiv by 1253.

In 1648, Bohdan Khmelnytsky and Petro Doroshenko led the largest of the Cossack uprisings against the Commonwealth and the Polish king.

Mykhailo Hrushevsky was the President the Central Council of Ukraine People's Republic.

Leonid Kravchuk is the First President of Ukraine elected in 1991.

United Kingdom

James VI and I is regarded by some as the first king of Great Britain (both England and Scotland).

Robert Walpole is considered the first Prime Minister of the United Kingdom.

Vatican City
Peter the Apostle is seen as the first pope.

Vatican City took on its modern form under the Lateran Treaty signed by Pope Pius XI.

Oceania

Australia

Early colonial era 
Captain Arthur Phillip was the first Governor of New South Wales and founder of the first British colony in Australia.

Late colonial and federation era 

Sir Henry Parkes is often regarded as the "Father of Federation" in Australia. During the late 19th century, he was the strongest proponent for a federation of Australian territories. However, he died before Australia federated, and was never able to see his plan come to fruition.

Andrew Inglis Clark is another founding father of Australia. He largely wrote the Australian Constitution in addition to developing the Hare-Clark system of voting and pushing for universal adult suffrage and other progressive ideals that would become law early in Australia's history.

Alfred Deakin also stands out as a significant founding father as he attended all the Federation Conferences, he gave up 10 years of senior political appointments to travel the country promoting federation and was Australia's first Attorney General. He was instrumental in securing Edmond Barton as the first Prime Minister while Deakin went on to be Australia's 2nd, 5th and 7th Prime Minister.  Deakin was responsible for establishing the High Court, Australian Navy, and many other important acts of parliament. Sir Robert Menzies is on record for saying he was Australia's greatest Prime Ministers.

John Dunmore Lang. Although passing away over two decades before federation, John Dunmore Lang was a strong advocate of a federation of the Australian colonies as a democratic republic, independent from the British Empire.

Sir Edmund Barton was the first Australian Prime Minister. Unlike many other nation's inaugural leaders, he is not often regarded as a Founder of Australia

Federated States of Micronesia
Chief Justice Andon Amaraich is regarded as "one of the founding fathers of the Federated States of Micronesia".

Fiji
Ratu Sir Kamisese Mara is widely viewed as the "Founding Father" of an independent Fiji.

Kiribati

Marshall Islands

Nauru

New Zealand
Maori people consider Kupe, a mythologised figure who led the first Polynesian migration to New Zealand from Hawaiki in the 10th century, to be a founding figure and the common ancestor of all Maori. In the 19th century, the Scottish businessman, James Busby, drafted the Declaration of the Independence of New Zealand and co-authored the Treaty of Waitangi with the Royal Navy officer, William Hobson. It is considered by many to be the founding document of the nation of New Zealand.

Palau

Papua New Guinea
Grand Chief Sir Michael Somare is viewed as the "Founding Father" of Papua New Guinea. The leading figure during the country's transition to independence from Australia, he was Papua New Guinea's first Prime Minister.

Samoa

Solomon Islands

Tonga

King George Tupou I, who united his country and established the contemporary Kingdom of Tonga, has been described as Tonga's "founding father".

Tuvalu

Vanuatu

Former states and other territories

Arabian Peninsula
Before the Islamic prophet Muhammad completed his migration to Yathrib (present day Medina), the Arabian peninsula was divided by tribalism. Spread out and distant, region to region. After the migration in 622 AD, Muhammad began to spread the word of Islam to the other Arab tribes outside of Mecca. Through this preaching and military expeditions, he accumulated a large army of loyal followers and returned to Mecca to conquer it in the name of Islam in 629 AD. At the time of his death in 632 AD, the region was bounded into one polity under the flag of Islam. After his death, the 4 Caliphs of the Rashidun Caliphate expanded the territory which led to victories against the Byzantine and Persian empires.

Bohemia
Although the first known ruler of Bohemia was Bořivoj I, Duke of Bohemia, the real unifier of various Slavic tribes in Bohemia and creator of nation was Duke Boleslaus I, Duke of Bohemia. Charles IV, Holy Roman Emperor is regarded as the "Father of the Homeland" in the Czech Republic, because during his time the Kingdom of Bohemia experienced the greatest prosperity. Tomáš Garrigue Masaryk (1850–1937) is widely revered as the Liberator President who played the chief role in the 1918 melding of Bohemia, Moravia, Slovakia and Ruthenia into the Czechoslovak Republic, and who served as President of the Republic from 1918 to 1935.

Czechoslovakia
 Tomáš Garrigue Masaryk, first President of Czechoslovakia, known as President Liberator.

Kingdom of England
It was King Athelstan (893/895–939) who united the several Anglo-Saxon kingdoms of England around the year 927, when he became King of the English as opposed to his previous title, King of the West Saxons. However, his fame is often overshadowed by his predecessor and grandfather Alfred the Great (871–899), who set in motion the unification of the English kingdoms and could also claim to be the nation's founder.

Ancient Korea
For ancient Korea, Hwanung (환웅/) and his son Dangun Wanggeom (단군왕검/) were the legendary founders of Gojoseon, the first kingdom of Korea. The founding date is usually calculated as 3 October 2333 BC; 3 October is a South Korean national holiday known as Gaecheonjeol (개천절/, "Festival of the Opening of Heaven"). However, in North Korea, Gaecheonjeol is not celebrated and recognized at all, unlike South Korea.

Ottoman Empire

By the end of the 14th century, most of Anatolia was controlled by various Anatolian beyliks due to the collapse of the Seljuk dynasty in the area. The Seljuk dynasty had established both the Seljuk Empire, which was founded by Tughril and the Sultanate of Rum, with the first one being responsible for the Turkification of Anatolia. Osman I unified the beyliks under one banner, proclaiming the Ottoman Empire.

Russian Empire
 Rurik – Varangian prince and Prince of Novgorod beginning around 862 AD 
 Oleg, Rurik's kinsman and successor; extended his realm from Novgorod south to the Dnieper River valley and later moved his capital to the more strategic Kiev, where he established Kievan Rus' (the modern peoples of Belarus, Ukraine, and Russia all have Kievan Rus' as their cultural heritage).
 Ivan the Terrible, Grand Prince of Moscow (also Prince of Novgorod) from 1533 to 1547 and Tsar of All the Russias from 1547 until his death in 1584. Ivan also claimed the historical title "Grand Prince of Kiev" for himself, but this was more of a flourish, since Kiev had never formed part of his realm and Moscow would not control the Kievan region until the Truce of Andrusovo (1667), but Kiev remained an important city in early Slavic history and culture.
 Peter the Great, Tsar from 1682, officially proclaimed the establishment of the Russian Empire in 1721, following the Treaty of Nystad, and himself its first emperor. He instituted sweeping reforms and oversaw the transformation of Russia into a major European power, re-organising the state in the Western style. Founder of Saint-Petersburg
 Vladimir the Great was the first Christian Prince of Kievan Rus.

Kingdom of Scotland
It was King Kenneth MacAlpin (841–858) who united Pictland and Scotland, around the year 843, when he became King of Scots, as opposed to his previous title, King of Dál Riada. However, his fame is partly eclipsed by Malcolm III (1058–1093), who was the first king to rule over nearly all Scotland, after annexing Strathclyde.

The fictionalising medieval poem The Wallace ( 1477) celebrated William Wallace (died 1305) as one of the founder-heroes of Scotland's struggle to preserve/re-establish independence from Plantagenet England.

Serbia and Montenegro
 Dobrica Ćosić, often referred to as the "Father of the Nation"

Soviet Union
 Vladimir Lenin – Officially one among many equal founders of the country, Lenin was, de facto, the paramount leader, founder of the Soviet Union and the CPSU, the party that ruled it via one-party rule as well as the founding father of the modern Russian state. He died soon after the country's founding and retained a special status of secular apotheosis for the rest of the country's history.

Republic of Texas
 Sam Houston
 William B. Travis
 Lorenzo de Zavala

Wales
 Magnus Maximus (c. 335–388). According to Welsh tradition, Magnus Maximus (Welsh: Macsen-Wledig) was a Roman general who was proclaimed Emperor of Rome by his soldiers in Britain in 383. As such, he was the first Romano-British ruler of Britain and the western portions of the Roman Empire. His mytho-heroic founding of Wales is celebrated in the modern Welsh anthem Yma o Hyd by Dafydd Iwan.
 Hywel Dda (c. 880–950) was responsible for the codification of traditional Welsh Law, which, according to historian John Davies, "was a powerful symbol of [Welsh] unity and identity, as powerful, indeed, as their language".
 Gruffydd ap Llywelyn (r. 1039–63) was the first Welsh king to rule over the entire territory of Wales, from about 1057 until his death in 1063.

Republic of Vietnam
 Ngô Đình Diệm (1901-1963), first president of South Vietnam.

Kingdom of Yugoslavia
 King Alexander I of Yugoslavia, known as Alexander the Unifier

Socialist Federal Republic of Yugoslavia
 Josip Broz Tito, Marshal of Yugoslavia (1943–1980)

Union of South Africa
 Louis Botha was the first Prime Minister of the Union of South Africa, and Jan Smuts, its second prime minister, was a prominent advocate of unification and seen in more recent polls as the Union of South Africa's greatest historical leader.
 Jan van Riebeeck was treated as a South African founding father by the South African government during the apartheid era, being featured on statues and the country's currency (although the likeness was erroneous and was actually that of another man).

Zaire
 Mobutu Sese Seko was the founder of Zaire and its only president.

References

National founders, list of

Founders